The 1949 New York Yankees season was their fourth and final in the All-America Football Conference. The team improved on their previous output of 6-8, winning eight games. They lost to the San Francisco 49ers in the first round of the playoffs and the team folded with the league after the season.

Season schedule

Playoffs

Division standings

References

New York Yankees (AAFC) seasons
New York Yankees
New York Yankees AAFC
1940s in the Bronx